This is a list of compositions by the French composer François-Adrien Boieldieu.

Operas 

 La Fille coupable (1793)
 Rosalie et Myrza (1795)
 La Famille suisse (1797)
 L'Heureuse Nouvelle (1797)
 Le Pari, ou Mombreuil et Merville (1797)
 Zoraïme et Zulnar (1798)
 La Dot de Suzette (1798)
 Les Méprises espagnoles (1799)
 Emma ou la Prisonnière (1799) with Luigi Cherubini
 Béniovski ou les Exilés du Kamchattka (1800)
 Le Calife de Bagdad (1800)
 Ma tante Aurore ou le Roman impromptu (1803)
 Le Baiser et la Quittance ou Une aventure de garnison (1803)
 Aline, reine de Golconde (1804)
 La Jeune Femme colère (1805)
 Abderkan (1805)
 Un tour de soubrette (1806)
 Télémaque (1806)
 Amour et mystère ou Lequel est mon cousin ? (1807)
 La Dame invisible (1808)
 L'Athalie (1808)
 Les voitures versées ou le Séducteur en voyage (1808)
 Rien de trop ou les Deux Paravents (1811)
 Jean de Paris (1812)
 Le Nouveau Seigneur de village (1813)
 Le Béarnais ou Henri IV en voyage (1814)
 Angéla ou l'Atelier de Jean Cousin (1814)
 La Fête du village voisin (1816)
 Charles de France ou Amour et gloire (1816)
 Le Petit Chaperon rouge (1818)
 Les Arts rivaux (1821)
 Blanche de Provence ou la Cour des fées (1821)
 La France et l'Espagne (1823)
 Les Trois Genres (1824) (with Auber)
 Pharamond (1825)
 La dame blanche (1825)
 Les Deux Nuits (1829)
 La Marquise de Brinvilliers (1831), with Auber, Cherubini and others

Concertos 
 Concerto pour harpe en ut majeur (1800)
 Concerto for piano in F major (1792)

Boieldieu, Francois-Adrien
Boieldieu, Francois-Adrien